Der Thurm zu Babel (The Tower of Babel) is a one-act 'sacred opera' by Anton Rubinstein to a libretto by Julius Rosenberg based on the story in the Book of Genesis, chapter II. The opera was written in 1869 and had its first performance in Königsberg on 9 February 1870.

Background
The term 'sacred opera' (geistliche Oper in German) was invented by Rubinstein to denote staged works with "use of polyphonic choruses and a sober, edifying style relying on ‘exalted declamation’." Rubinstein composed three other works of this type (Sulamith,
Moses and Christus). A fifth sacred opera, Cain, was uncompleted at his death.

The composer had hoped for a premiere in Berlin, but was consoled by the work's second production in Vienna on 20 February 1870, (which was attended by Johannes Brahms), after which Rubinstein wrote it had been 'brilliantly performed and very well received by the public.' The work's first performance in America was in May 1881 in New York City, when it was conducted by Leopold Damrosch.

The destruction of the Tower in Der Thurm zu Babel is imaginatively realized by discordant passages in the orchestra (involving some passages in quintuple metre) and the chorus beginning to sing in three different languages.  A performance lasts about 45 minutes.

Roles

Synopsis
Nimrod and the Master Builder exult at the imminent success of their project to reach Heaven by building the Tower. Abraham rebukes them and is thrown into a fiery furnace at Nimrod's orders. As the workers praise Baal, angels descend and destroy the Tower, to the confusion of Nimrod and all present. Both the angels and the demons claim victory. 'As usual', comments Richard Taruskin, 'the last-named get the most imaginative music'.

Notes

Sources
 Graham Dixon and Richard Taruskin. "Sacred opera." Grove Music Online accessed 17 April 2010
 Carl Gerbrand, Sacred music drama: the producer's guide; second edition, Bloomington, 2006. Accessed in Google Books, April 18, 2010
 
 Richard Taruskin. Thurm zu Babel, Der. Grove Music Online accessed 18 April 2010

Operas
1870 operas
German-language operas
Operas by Anton Rubinstein
Operas based on the Bible
One-act operas
Tower of Babel